The following tables are an overview of all current national records in the marathon, as compiled by the International Association of Athletics Federations and other authoritative sources of road racing statistics.

Background
The IAAF is the international governing body for the sport of athletics. As of 2018, the national governing bodies of 214 countries and territories are affiliated to the IAAF as National Member Federations. According to the IAAF, their lists of national records "mainly include official records as recognized by various national federations" and notes that in some cases "federations recognize invalid performances". The Boston Marathon is considered the site of several national records, yet this course is invalid for the world record because it is point-to-point with a greater than allowable elevation drop -— performance aiding situations.

The IAAF's list includes Palestine, whose Palestine Athletic Federation is the national governing body of athletics affiliated to the IAAF. The United Kingdom of Great Britain and Northern Ireland is represented in the IAAF by UK Athletics, which in turn is affiliated with the athletic associations of England, Northern Ireland, Scotland, and Wales (collectively known as the Home Country Athletics Federations). Although the IAAF notes only the fastest performance under the UK umbrella, these associations each compile a list of national records in track and field. The IAAF's list includes some British overseas territories that compete under their own flags (e.g. Bermuda, British Virgin Islands, and Cayman Islands).

Other road racing sources slightly differ regarding which types of political states are included in their national records lists. For example, Athletics Weekly's list includes countries of England, Scotland, Wales, and Northern Ireland, as well as the Crown Dependencies of Guernsey, the Isle of Man, and Jersey which are technically not part of the United Kingdom. The Association of Road Racing Statisticians' list includes all of the above plus the British overseas territory of Saint Helena. Similar list variations occur with other political states or territories affiliated with Denmark, France, and New Zealand.

Another important reference source is the 2018 edition of NATIONAL ATHLETICS RECORDS (NAR) for all countries in the world by Winfried Kramer with the assistance of Heinrich Hubbeling, Yves Pinaud and Steffan Stube.

Several national records were run on a date when an athlete represented a country currently no longer in existence such as the Union of Soviet Socialist Republics, Czechoslovakia and Yugoslavia. On achieving independence the appropriate national federation of the current national state retroactively recognized them as valid NRs.

Marathon records by region

The following table contains marathon records within each world region.

Men

Women

Men's national records
Key:

Women's national records

See also

Marathon year rankings
Marathon world record progression

Notes

References

Marathon running
 Marathon